John Albert Sexsmith (April 22, 1866 – February 6, 1943) was a farmer and political figure in Ontario, Canada. He represented Peterborough East in the House of Commons of Canada from 1908 to 1917 as a Conservative and from 1917 to 1921 as a Unionist Party member.

He was born in Belmont Township, Canada West, the son of Thomas Sexsmith, and was educated there. Sexsmith married Bessie M. Buchanan in 1909. He was a farmer in Havelock. He served on the township council for Belmont from 1893 to 1897 and was reeve from 1899 to 1905. Sexsmith ran unsuccessfully for a seat in the House of Commons in 1900 and 1904. He was defeated when he ran for reelection in 1921. He died in Belmont at the age of 76.

References

Members of the House of Commons of Canada from Ontario
Conservative Party of Canada (1867–1942) MPs
1866 births
1943 deaths